Gemma Etheridge  (born 1 December 1986) is a semi-professional Australian Rugby Union player. She represents Australia in Sevens Rugby. Born in Tamworth, New South Wales and playing for The Tribe at a club level, she debuted for Australia in November 2012. She won a gold medal at the 2016 Summer Olympics in Rio.

Gemma Etheridge, who is the twin sister of fellow Rugby Sevens player, Nikki, is a qualified Radiographer from Tamworth, but calls Toowoomba home. Gemma is a utility and can play either as a forward or as a back. Gemma grew up on a farm and still spends a lot of weekends doing cattle work. In November 2015, Etheridge was the first female Sevens Player Director to join the Rugby Union Players’ Association (RUPA) Board. She was a member of Australia's team at the 2016 Olympics, defeating New Zealand in the final to win the inaugural Olympic gold medal in the sport.

At the 2017 Australia Day Honours she received the Medal of the Order of Australia for service to sport as a gold medallist at the Rio 2016 Olympic Games.

References

External links
 Gemma Etheridge at Australian Rugby
 
 
 

1986 births
Australian female rugby union players
Australia international rugby sevens players
Australian female rugby sevens players
Living people
Medalists at the 2016 Summer Olympics
Olympic gold medalists for Australia
Olympic medalists in rugby sevens
Olympic rugby sevens players of Australia
Recipients of the Medal of the Order of Australia
Rugby sevens players at the 2016 Summer Olympics
People from Tamworth, New South Wales
Rugby union players from New South Wales